William Grundy (1914 – after 1935) was an English professional footballer who played in the Football League for Coventry City and Mansfield Town.

References

1914 births
English footballers
Association football midfielders
English Football League players
Coventry City F.C. players
Mansfield Town F.C. players
Year of death missing